Cun (Chinese: 村話; meaning "village language/speech") or Gelong (仡隆语 / 哥隆语) or Ngan-Fon is a Kra–Dai language spoken on Hainan Island. It is a part of the Hlai languages branch and has a lexical similarity with standard Hlai at 40%. The language has approximately 80,000 speakers, 47,200 of which are monolingual. Cun is a tonal language with 10 tones, used depending on whether a syllable is checked or unchecked. The speakers of this language are classified by the Chinese government as ethnic Han (same with speakers of Lingao).

The Cun language is considered a dialect of the Han Li language.

The Cun were originally Han Chinese people who migrated to Hainan Island and intermingled with the Li people.

References

http://www.language-archives.org/language/cuq

Languages of China
Hlai languages